"Maze" (stylized as "m•a•z•e") is Kumi Koda's sixth domestic CD single. The single charted at #25 on Oricon and stayed on the charts for five weeks.

Information
m•a•z•e is Japanese R&B singer Kumi Koda's sixth domestic single under the Avex sub-label Rhythm Zone. It charted at #25 on the Oricon Weekly charts and, despite the low charting, remained on the charts for five weeks. The single was her second single released for her studio album, grow into one.

The single's b-side, "one," featured Japanese R&B singer LISA, who would later feature both Kumi and the Heartsdales in her song "Switch." Both Kumi and the Heartsdales would also be featured in the music video, which carried a futuristic, but grunge-looking Tokyo. "one" was also placed on the corresponding album, grow into one. Despite LISA being in the song, the track listing on the back covers of the single did not list her as the featured artist.

Both "m•a•z•e" and "one" made it to the album grow into one, but only "m•a•z•e" had its own music video placed on the DVD 7 Spirits.

In 2015, thirteen years after the single's release, Kumi would perform the song "one" with LISA live during her 15th Anniversary Premium Live at a-nation island.

Promotions
"m•a•z•e" was used during a scene in the NTV drama Psycho Doctor (サイコドクター / SAIKODOKUTAA). Due to this, the music video for the track would center around psychology and psychosis.

Music video
The music video for "m•a•z•e" carried a psychological theme, with Kumi being evaluated by a male psychologist. Throughout the video, Kumi hallucinates seeing the psychologist and his assistant performing odd tasks and experiments, which seem to be triggered from the images she is shown - many being disturbing. At the end of the video, she is seen walking to board a plane to escape from her own psychosis.

The theme for the music video was brought on due to the song being used in the Japanese drama Psycho Doctor.

Track listing
(Source)

Charts (Japan)

Alternate versions
m•a•z•e
m•a•z•e: Found on the single (2002) and corresponding album Grow Into One (2003)
m•a•z•e [L12 Remix]: Found on the single (2002)
m•a•z•e [UNITED COLORS Remix]: Found on Koda Kumi Driving Hit's 3 (2011)

References

External links
 Koda Kumi Official Site

2002 singles
2002 songs
Koda Kumi songs